The Neuer Botanischer Garten der Universität Göttingen (36 hectares), also known as the Experimenteller Botanischer Garten, is a research botanical garden maintained by the University of Göttingen. It is located immediately adjacent to the university's Forstbotanischer Garten und Arboretum at Grisebachstraße 1, Göttingen, Lower Saxony, Germany, and open daily without charge.

The garden was established by Prof. Heinz Ellenberg (1913–1997) in 1967 as an experimental facility to augment the historic Alter Botanischer Garten der Universität Göttingen. In 2009 its name was changed to the Experimenteller Botanischer Garten.

The garden contains special collections of Centaurea and related genera, native flora of Central Europe, holarctic forest vegetation, endangered wild plants, and rare weeds, as well as an alpine garden (5000 m²), wild rose collection, and pond (400 m²) with aquatic and swamp plants.

See also 

 Old Botanical Garden of Göttingen University
 Forstbotanischer Garten und Pflanzengeographisches Arboretum der Universität Göttingen
 List of botanical gardens in Germany

References 
 Neuer Botanischer Garten der Universität Göttingen
 Hermann von Helmholtz-Zentrum entry
 BGCI entry
 "Göttingen: Neuer Botanischer Garten der Universität", in Schmidt, Loki (ed.), Die botanischen Gärten in Deutschland, Hamburg : Hoffmann und Campe, 1997, pages 137–140.

Göttingen, Neuer Botanischer Garten der Universitat
Göttingen, Neuer Botanischer Garten der Universitat
University of Göttingen